Zhazhada is a rural locality (a selo) in Nachadinsky Selsoviet, Tlyaratinsky District, Republic of Dagestan, Russia. The population was 200 as of 2010.

Geography 
Zhazhada is located 28 km northeast of Tlyarata (the district's administrative centre) by road. Khotlob is the nearest rural locality.

References 

Rural localities in Tlyaratinsky District